Harold Medberry Bemis (July 15, 1884 – February 16, 1970) was a Rear Admiral in the United States Navy.

Early life 
Bemis was born July 15, 1884, in Oshkosh, Wisconsin.

Personal life 
He married Hazel Haynes on November 20, 1926.

Military career
Bemis graduated from the United States Naval Academy in 1906. He served on the USS Maine. He would serve in World War I as the Commander of Submarine Division Five. He graduated from the Naval War College in 1934. From 1938 to 1939, he served as a Naval Attache. Later, he served in World War II. His retirement was effective as of August 1, 1946.

Civilian career
From 1947-1953, he served as President-Chairman of the Board, Compania Anonima Venezolana Lummus in Caracas, Venezuela.

Awards 
He received the Navy Distinguished Service Medal, the World War I Victory Medal, the World War II Victory Medal, the American Defense Service Medal, and the American Campaign Medal.  He received the Order of Abdon Calderón medal from Ecuador.

Death and legacy 
Bemis died on February 16, 1970, at  his home in Washington, D.C., and is buried at Arlington National Cemetery.

Bemis' papers are held by United States Naval History & Heritage Command.

References

External links
 https://www.findagrave.com/memorial/35638377

People from Oshkosh, Wisconsin
Military personnel from Wisconsin
United States Navy rear admirals
Recipients of the Navy Distinguished Service Medal
United States Navy personnel of World War I
United States Navy World War II admirals
United States Naval Academy alumni
Naval War College alumni
Burials at Arlington National Cemetery
1970 deaths
Submariners
1884 births